Thống Nhất is a ward located in Biên Hòa city of Đồng Nai province, Vietnam. It has an area of about 3.4km2 and the population in 2018 was 22,786.

References

Bien Hoa